Sinking Ship is a  elevation summit located in the Grand Canyon, in Coconino County of northern Arizona, United States. According to the Köppen climate classification system, Sinking Ship is located in a cold semi-arid climate zone.

Etymology
This geographical feature was named "Three Castles" before its present name was officially adopted in 1932 by the U.S. Board on Geographic Names. The descriptive name is because the dip or tilt of the strata, caused by bending movement of the rock, creates the appearance of a ship sinking into the canyon. The name is attributable to M. R. (Miner Raymond) Tillotson (1886–1955), superintendent of Grand Canyon National Park from 1922 to 1938.

Geology
The summit of Sinking Ship is composed of Kaibab Limestone caprock overlaying cream-colored, cliff-forming, Permian Coconino Sandstone. The sandstone, which is the third-youngest of the strata in the Grand Canyon, was deposited 265 million years ago as sand dunes. Below the Coconino Sandstone is slope-forming, Permian Hermit Formation, which in turn overlays the Pennsylvanian-Permian Supai Group. Further down are strata of Mississippian Redwall Limestone, and Cambrian Tonto Group. Whereas most strata of the Grand Canyon are normally horizontal, at Sinking Ship the strata have been shifted by the Cremation Fault and a monocline. This Precambrian fault was dormant until reawakened during the Laramide orogeny. The eastward tilt of Sinking Ship is due to its position astride the axis of the Grandview-Phantom monocline. Precipitation runoff from Sinking Ship drains north into the nearby Colorado River via Hance Creek.

Gallery

See also
 Geology of the Grand Canyon area
 The Battleship (Grand Canyon)

References

External links 

 Weather forecast: National Weather Service
 Sinking Ship photo: Flickr
 Buffalo Bill and John Hance at Sinking Ship: 1892 photo
 Sinking Ship photo by Harvey Butchart

Grand Canyon
Grand Canyon, South Rim
Landforms of Coconino County, Arizona
Mountains of Coconino County, Arizona
Colorado Plateau
Grand Canyon National Park
North American 2000 m summits
Buttes of Arizona
Sandstone formations of the United States